Kion Reece Etete (born 28 November 2001) is an English professional footballer who plays as a forward for EFL Championship club Cardiff City.

Playing career
Etete came through the youth team at Notts County and made his senior debut for the 'Magpies' in a group stage match of the EFL Trophy against Newcastle United U21 on 9 October 2018, coming on as a 76th-minute substitute for fellow youth-team player Tyreece Kennedy-Williams. He made his EFL League Two debut on 3 November 2018, replacing Kristian Dennis 73 minutes into a 2–2 draw with Port Vale at Vale Park; after the game he said "I was nervous because it was a big occasion and I just wanted to keep my head on the game". Manager Harry Kewell said that "Kion was excellent". 

In 2019, Etete underwent a trial at Tottenham Hotspur, scoring twice in an U18 game against West Ham United. On 7 June 2019, Notts County announced, via Twitter, that Etete had officially joined Tottenham Hotspur after a successful trial at the club.

At the start of August 2021, Etete signed a new contract with Tottenham until 2023 and went out on loan to Northampton Town for the 2021–22 season. He made his Northampton debut in the Carabao Cup on 11 August 2021, scoring twice against Coventry City in a 2-1 win.

He scored his first league goal on 19 October 2021 in a 3–0 home win against Stevenage.

In January 2022, after being recalled from his loan, he moved to League One side Cheltenham Town on loan until the end of the season.

Personal life
Etete was born in England to a Nigerian mother and English father.

Etete’s brother is called Kayden Etete.

Statistics

References

2001 births
Living people
Footballers from Derby
English footballers
English people of Nigerian descent
Black British sportspeople
Association football forwards
Notts County F.C. players
Tottenham Hotspur F.C. players
Northampton Town F.C. players
Cheltenham Town F.C. players
Cardiff City F.C. players
English Football League players